The William Weigle House and Water Tank, near Jerome, Idaho, is a lava rock structure built in 1919. It was listed on the National Register of Historic Places in 1983.

It is a one-and-a-half-story bungalow-style house with an approximately  plan.  It has wide eaves with exposed rafters, and a centered tall stone chimney.  It includes a water tank.

References

Houses on the National Register of Historic Places in Idaho
Buildings and structures completed in 1919
Jerome County, Idaho
Lava rock buildings and structures
Water tanks on the National Register of Historic Places